Clara Woltering (born 2 March 1983) is a retired German handball goalkeeper, who played on the German women's national handball team.

International career
Woltering made her debut on the German team in 2003, finished fifth within the 2004 European Championship, and sixth in the 2005 World Championship. At the 2006 European Championship she finished fourth, and received a bronze medal at the 2007 World Championship.

She competed at the 2008 Summer Olympics in Beijing, where Germany finished eleventh.

Club career
Woltering was German Cupwinner with Bayer Leverkusen in 2002, and finalist in 2005. In 2005, she won the Challenge Cup with Bayer Leverkusen. In 2012 and 2015 she won *Champions League: with ŽRK Budućnost.

Achievements
Champions League:
Winner: 2012, 2015
German Cup:
Winner: 2002, 2010
Montenegrin Championship:
Winner: 2012, 2013, 2014, 2015
Montenegrin Cup:
Winner: 2012, 2013, 2014, 2015
Women's Regional Handball League:
Winner: 2012, 2013, 2014, 2015
EHF Challenge Cup:
Winner: 2005
World Championship:
Bronze Medalist: 2007

Awards
German Handballer of the Year: 2009, 2010, 2017
MVP of the EHF Champions League Final Four 2015

References

External links
Profile on the German Handball Federation official website
Leverkusen who's who

1983 births
Living people
German female handball players
Olympic handball players of Germany
Handball players at the 2008 Summer Olympics
Expatriate handball players
Sportspeople from Münster